The 1995 Yonex All England Open was the 85th edition of the All England Open Badminton Championships. It was held from 14 to 18 March 1995, in Birmingham, England.

It was a five-star tournament and the prize money was US$125,000.

Venue
National Indoor Arena

Final results

Men's singles

Section 1

Section 2

Women's singles

Section 1

Section 2

References

External links
Smash: 1995 All England Open

All England Open Badminton Championships
All England Open
All England
Sports competitions in Birmingham, West Midlands
March 1995 sports events in the United Kingdom